Stephen Richard Previs (born February 9, 1950 in Bethel Park, Pennsylvania) is a retired American basketball point guard who spent one season in the American Basketball Association (ABA) as a member of the Carolina Cougars during the 1972–73 season. He attended University of North Carolina where he was drafted by the Boston Celtics during the 1972 NBA Draft, but he did not play for them.

External links

Living people
1950 births
American men's basketball players
Basketball players from Pennsylvania
Boston Celtics draft picks
Carolina Cougars players
North Carolina Tar Heels men's basketball players
People from Bethel Park, Pennsylvania
Point guards